Glenbervie railway station is located on the Craigieburn line in Victoria, Australia. It serves the northern Melbourne suburb of Essendon, and opened on 11 September 1922.

History
The railway line past the site of Glenbervie station originally opened in 1872, as part of the North East line to School House Lane. The station itself opened on 11 September 1922, a year after the line was electrified. It was named in honour of local settler Thomas Napier, who was originally from Scotland. Glenbervie, in Aberdeenshire, was the ancestral birthplace of Napier's father, grandfather, and great grandfather.

The station was initially provided with small timber station buildings. In 1976, they were replaced by the current buildings. A timber footbridge originally linked the two platforms.

Platforms and services
Glenbervie has two side platforms. It is served by Craigieburn line trains.

Platform 1:
  all stations services to Flinders Street

Platform 2:
  all stations services to Craigieburn

References

External links
 Melway map at street-directory.com.au

Railway stations in Melbourne
Railway stations in Australia opened in 1922
Essendon, Victoria
Railway stations in the City of Moonee Valley